These are locomotives of the Chicago, Milwaukee, St. Paul and Pacific Railroad, often referred to as the "Milwaukee Road". The Milwaukee was acquired by the Soo Line in 1985 and the Soo subsequently became part of the Canadian Pacific Railway.

Steam 
Milwaukee Road steam locomotives were organized into classes by wheel arrangement. Additional suffixes, where used indicated:

 s: fitted with a superheater (where the class was not fitted from new)
 r: fitted with a mechanical stoker (where the class was not fitted from new)

Class A: 4-4-2
Class A was the 4-4-2 type.

Class B: 4-6-0
Class B was for Vauclain compound 4-6-0s built by Baldwin Locomotive Works. Most were rebuilt as simple engines, those not rebuilt were scrapped in the late 1920s.

Class C: 2-8-0
Class C was the 2-8-0 type.

Class D: 0-8-0
Class D was the 0-8-0 type.

Class E
Class E was reserved for the electric locomotives.

Class F: 4-6-2 and 4-6-4
Class F covered the 4-6-2 and 4-6-4 types.

Class G: 4-6-0
Class G was the simple 4-6-0 type, some of which were rebuilt from class B compounds.

Class H: 4-4-0
Class H covered the 4-4-0 "American" type.
 Milwaukee Road class H1
 Milwaukee Road class H2
 Milwaukee Road class H3
 Milwaukee Road class H4
 Milwaukee Road class H5

Class I: 0-6-0
Class I covered the 0-6-0 switcher types.

Class J: 0-4-0
Class J covered 0-4-0 switchers.

Class K: 2-6-2
Class K comprised 2-6-2 "Prairie" locomotives.

Class L: 2-8-2
Class L was for 2-8-2 "Mikado" locomotives.

Class M: 2-6-0
Class M was for the 2-6-0 type.

Class N: 2-6-6-2
Class N consisted of articulated locomotives of 2-6-6-2 arrangement.

Class S: 4-8-4
Class S were 4-8-4 "Northern" locomotives.

Class X: Shays
Class X consisted of Shay locomotives.
 Milwaukee Road class X1
 Milwaukee Road class X2

Diesel

ALCO

Baldwin

Davenport

EMD

Switchers

Cab units

Cowl units

Hood units

Fairbanks-Morse

General Electric

Whitcomb

Electric 

The Milwaukee Road was one of the most electrified railroads in the United States. The system used was 3,000 volt DC overhead line.

Switchers 

 Milwaukee Road class ES-1 - 1 example (built 1915), the Great Falls, Montana switcher. Used 1,500 volts DC.
 Milwaukee Road class ES-2 - 4 examples (built 1916–19).

Passenger 

 Milwaukee Road class EP-1 - 12 2-unit boxcab sets (24 locomotives) built in 1915 by ALCO/GE. Converted to freight class EF-1 in 1920. In 1950, two boxcab two-unit sets were converted for passenger service (class EP-1A).
 Milwaukee Road class EP-2 - The "Bi-Polars". 5 built by GE in 1919.
 Milwaukee Road class EP-3 - The "Quills" (quill drive). 10 built by Baldwin/Westinghouse in 1919.
 Milwaukee Road class EP-4 - "Little Joes". Two examples built by GE in 1946. Converted to freight class EF-4 in 1956.

Freight 
 Milwaukee Road class EF-1 - 30 two-unit boxcab sets (60 locomotives) built in 1915 by ALCO/GE, identical to EP-1 but for gearing and paint. In addition, the EP-1 units were converted to EF-1 specification in 1920.
 Milwaukee Road class EF-2 - 3-unit boxcab sets formed from EF-1s in the 1930s.
 Milwaukee Road class EF-3 - 3-unit boxcab sets formed from EF-1s with the middle unit shortened by removing the cab and leading truck; the resultant B units were known as "bobtails".
 Milwaukee Road class EF-4 - "Little Joes". 10 examples built by GE in 1946 for the Soviet Ministry of Railways as Class A. In addition, the EP-4 locomotives were converted to EF-4 specification in 1956.
 Milwaukee Road class EF-5 - Four-unit boxcab sets formed with any combination of regular or bobtail units in the middle.

Preserved locomotives

Steam
Only six Milwaukee Road Steam locomotives survive:

In addition, the tender from a class S2 locomotive also survives.

Electric
10200A+B, later E50A+B - class EF-1 at the Lake Superior Railroad Museum in Duluth, Minnesota
10211B, later E57B - class ES-3 at Harlowton, Montana
10251, later E2 - class EP-2, at the National Museum of Transportation in St. Louis, Missouri
E70 - class EF-4 at Deer Lodge, Montana

References 

 
 



Locomotives

Milwaukee Road